André Luiz de Souza Silva or simply known as Biju (born September 17, 1974) is a Brazilian former football player. His nickname is "Biju" because it was the name of a vegetable dish he often ate as a child.

After playing professionally in his native Brazil for three years, Biju joined the J2 League at Consadole Sapporo in 1999. In 2002, he moved to Kyoto Purple Sanga, and then Sagan Tosu. From 2006 he played for Ventforet Kofu. He joined Mito mid-season of 2007 on a 6-month contract. He spent his last career at Zweigen Kanazawa in Japanese Regional Leagues.

Club statistics

Personal life
Biju's wife is Japanese.

References

External links

1974 births
Living people
Brazilian footballers
Brazilian expatriate footballers
J1 League players
J2 League players
União São João Esporte Clube players
Hokkaido Consadole Sapporo players
Kyoto Sanga FC players
Sagan Tosu players
Ventforet Kofu players
Mito HollyHock players
Zweigen Kanazawa players
Expatriate footballers in Japan
Association football midfielders